CA: A Cancer Journal for Clinicians is a bimonthly peer-reviewed medical journal published for the American Cancer Society by Wiley-Blackwell. The journal covers aspects of cancer research on diagnosis, therapy, and prevention.

Abstracting and indexing 
The journal is abstracted and indexed in:

According to the 2020 Journal Citation Reports, the journal has a 2020 impact factor of 508.7, ranking it first among all journals in the database.

References

External links 
 

Oncology journals
Bimonthly journals
English-language journals
Publications established in 1950
Wiley-Blackwell academic journals
1950 establishments in the United States
Academic journals associated with learned and professional societies of the United States
American Cancer Society